Dadpur is a village near Bhawanipatna in Kalahandi district of Orissa state of India.

References

Villages in Kalahandi district